George Burton may refer to:

George Burton (actor) (1898–1955), American silent film actor
George Burton (bishop) (1856–1931), English Roman Catholic Bishop
George Burton (chronologer) (1717–1791), English chronologer
George Burton (cricketer) (1851–1930), English cricketer from London
George Burton (footballer, born 1871) (1871–1944), English footballer
George Burton (rugby union) (1855–1890), English rugby international from Yorkshire
George Burton (1910s footballer), English footballer

See also
George Burton Adams (1851–1925), American historian
George Burton Hunter (1845–1937), shipping magnate